Sverre Gillebo (9 December 1912 – 24 May 1971) was a Norwegian épée fencer. He competed at the 1948 and 1952 Summer Olympics.

References

External links
 

1912 births
1971 deaths
Norwegian male épée fencers
Olympic fencers of Norway
Fencers at the 1948 Summer Olympics
Fencers at the 1952 Summer Olympics
Sportspeople from Oslo
20th-century Norwegian people